This is a list of appointments to the South Australian Legislative Council, caused by the resignation or death of an incumbent member. A departure creates a casual vacancy which is filled by a candidate of the same affiliation in a joint sitting of the Parliament of South Australia. The constitution states that if the previous sitting Legislative Council member was at the time of his/her election the representative of a particular political party, that party should nominate a replacement from amongst its own members.

History
Until the 1975 election, casual vacancies in the Legislative Council, like the House of Assembly, were also filled at South Australian Legislative Council by-elections. Amendments to the South Australian Constitution and Electoral Acts saw the whole state become a single electorate for the Legislative Council and gave, in line with the Australian Senate, an assembly of members of both Houses of Parliament the right to meet to choose a replacement member.

List of appointments
There have been 26 appointments since 1975: thirteen Labor, eight Liberal, three Democrats, one Family First and one independent.

See also
List of South Australian Legislative Council by-elections
List of South Australian state by-elections

Notes
 Though Finnigan sat as an independent from 2011, he was elected as a Labor candidate at the 2010 election, as such the joint sitting duly endorsed a Labor appointment.

References

Legislative Council appointments